The Raid on Combahee Ferry (also known as the Combahee River Raid) was a military operation during the American Civil War conducted on June 1 and June 2, 1863, by elements of the Union Army along the Combahee River in Beaufort and Colleton counties in the South Carolina Lowcountry.

Harriet Tubman, who had escaped from slavery in 1849 and guided many others to freedom, led an expedition of 150 African American soldiers of the 2nd South Carolina Infantry. The Union ships rescued and transported more than 750 former slaves freed five months earlier by the Emancipation Proclamation, many of whom joined the Union Army.

Background
Following the first shots of the Civil War at Fort Sumter in Charleston Harbor, South Carolina, the newly formed Confederate States of America quickly moved to defend coastal South Carolina. Union forces tried to take control of the area to secure the fine harbors, which they needed to operate successfully in the South. In November 1861, Union Navy and Army troops invaded Port Royal, south of Charleston near the town of Beaufort. They occupied most of Beaufort County and the Sea Islands.

Planters and overseers fled area plantations ahead of the oncoming Union troops, and their departure effectively liberated thousands of slaves. Several Union Army infantry regiments were formed with these former slaves, including the 2nd South Carolina Infantry under Col. James Montgomery. Montgomery was a guerilla fighter from Kansas who had fought in numerous clashes between pro- and anti-slavery forces there and in Missouri before the war. His style of warfare became common in South Carolina, Georgia and Florida. In 1862 Tubman had been assigned to Beaufort to help teach and nurse the former slaves on the Sea Islands.

In the spring of 1863, Union commanders began planning raids into the fortified upper reaches of South Carolina's coastal rivers, such as the Combahee, Ashepoo, and Edisto.  The objectives were to remove torpedoes (mines) from the river, seize supplies from area plantations, and destroy the plantations. In addition, the Union forces were to encourage recruits for infantry regiments among any healthy adult male slaves freed by these actions.

The Combahee Ferry raid
On the evening of June 1, 1863 three small ships (Sentinel, USS Harriet A. Weed, and ) left Beaufort heading for the Combahee. They transported 300 men from the 2nd South Carolina, commanded by Colonel Montgomery, with Company C of the 3rd Rhode Island Heavy Artillery manning the ships' guns. Well known abolitionist Harriet Tubman accompanied the troops. Shortly after leaving Beaufort, the Sentinel ran aground in St. Helena Sound.

About three o'clock in the morning of the same June 2, the two remaining ships arrived at the mouth of the Combahee River at Fields Point, where Montgomery landed a small detachment under Captain Thompson. They drove off several Confederate pickets and advanced up the river. Some of the fleeing Confederates rode to the nearby village of Green Pond to sound the alarm. Meanwhile, a company of the 2nd South Carolina under Captain Carver landed two miles above Fields Point at Tar Bluff and deployed into position. The two ships steamed upriver to the Nichols Plantation, where the gunboat Harriet A. Weed anchored.

Carrying the remainder of the 2nd South Carolina and Tubman, the John Adams went upriver to Combahee Ferry, where a temporary pontoon bridge spanned the river. As the Union ship approached, several mounted Confederates rode over the bridge in the direction of Green Pond. The John Adams fired a few shells at them. Troops deployed from the ship set fire to the bridge. Captain Hoyt took his men to the far side, while Captain Brayton, of the 3rd Rhode Island, proceeded up the left riverbank to the Middleton plantation, "Newport", under orders to confiscate all property and lay waste to what could not be carried off.

The John Adams steamed upriver for a short distance until forced to stop by obstructions and pilings. Turning back, she tied up at the causeway. Although Confederate troops stationed at Green Pond were notified of the raid, they did not respond at first. Because of diseases endemic in the Lowcountry during the summer "sick season", such as malaria, typhoid fever, and smallpox, officers had pulled back most Confederate troops from the rivers and swamps, leaving only small detachments. Before this raid, the Confederates had received a false alarm, so the few remaining outposts were cautious about responding to reports of ships or activity until certain they were Union.

Within a few hours, Confederate reinforcements responded from McPhearsonville, Pocotaligo, Green Pond and Adams Run. Colonel Breeden arrived with a few guns and opened fire on the retiring Union troops headed back across the causeway. The John Adams soon overwhelmed them with its superior firepower, forcing the Confederates from the causeway and back into the woods.

By this time, the rest of Montgomery's troops had torched William Cruger Heyward's plantation and C.T. Lowndes's rice mill. They destroyed the houses, mills, and outbuildings. At Nichols Plantation, all of the buildings were set on fire. Union forces took the stores of commodity rice and cotton, as well as supplies of potatoes, corn, and livestock, and left the plantations as smoking ruins. Hearing reports of Federal advances from Fields Point up to the Stokes (Stocks) Causeway, Confederate commanders sent troops in that direction. Upon arrival, they found the Union forces out of reach. Outgunned and outnumbered, the Southern reinforcements retreated to their previous positions.

Liberation of slaves
Those slaves working in the fields, unaware of the Emancipation Proclamation, were wary when they first saw the approaching Union ships and troops, but word spread quickly that the forces were there to liberate them. Many ran to the riverbank and begged to be taken on board the ships, despite the efforts of overseers and Confederate soldiers to stop them.

In an 1869 biography of Tubman written by Sarah Hopkins Bradford, Harriet Tubman is quoted:

Hundreds of slaves stood on the shore. When the small boats put out to get them, they all wanted to get in at once. After the boats were filled to capacity and beyond, the throng of escapees still ashore held on to the boats to prevent them from leaving, putting the boats in danger of capsizing. Oarsmen tried beating them on their hands, but the freed workers would not let go. The small boats made several trips back and forth to load those who wanted to leave.

The Union ships returned to Beaufort the next day. Soldiers took the freedmen to stay at the First Baptist Church before they were transported to a resettlement camp on St. Helena Island. Due to the efforts in planning and intelligence provided by Tubman and her contacts, more than 750 slaves were freed as a result of Montgomery's raid. Many of the men joined the Union Army.

Newspaper accounts of the raid
The official Union reports of the raid have never been found. Numerous newspaper accounts reported the raid and included comments by the commanding officers.

The pro-Union Commonwealth reported:

The pro-Southern Charleston Mercury reported:

Aftermath
The raid was so successful that Union forces adopted its tactics for similar operations. Tubman later said that the only flaw was her choice of clothing in that her green dress had been damaged and torn by excited freedmen boarding the ships. A few weeks later, the 2nd South Carolina and the 54th Massachusetts raided up the river to Darien, Georgia, and left the town in smoldering ruins. The Union wanted to damage the Confederate states' ability to supply food and materials for the war effort.

The Combahee Ferry raid proved the value of black troops in combat and demonstrated Harriet Tubman's intelligence and bravery. After the raid, Confederate forces rushed to complete several small earthworks and batteries to better defend the area. The Union did not threaten the region again until the march through the Carolinas by General William T. Sherman in early 1865. The abandoned plantations surrounding Combahee Ferry were not rebuilt during the war; the South went without needed supplies and many of the planters were virtually bankrupted. Several plantations remained unoccupied well after the war.

The raid lent its name to the Combahee River Collective, a Black feminist organization active in the 1970s.

The Combahee Ferry area today
The location of the Combahee River raid was identified to state and Federal officials by Jeff Grigg prior to a survey related to a bridge replacement project across the Combahee River on U.S. Highway 17. The general area remains in much the same condition as it was during the war, and the causeway is on the same alignment. In 2006, the South Carolina legislature approved a resolution authored by State Representative Kenneth Hodges to name the new bridge after Harriet Tubman in recognition of her role in the historic raid. Also the site of a 1782 Revolutionary War battle, the immediate area has been proposed as a historic district.

The site can be viewed from the boat landing parking lot on the Beaufort side of the river. The surrounding area is under private ownership.

In popular culture
The Combahee River Raid forms the basis for the 2019 novel The Tubman Command, by historian Elizabeth Cobbs. The raid was also a major plot point of "The General", the penultimate episode of the second season of Timeless on May 13, 2018. The raid was also depicted briefly in the epilogue of the 2019 movie Harriet. It was a segment in a Drunk History episode in September of 2015.

Notes

References
 U.S. War Department, The War of the Rebellion: a Compilation of the Official Records of the Union and Confederate Armies, U.S. Government Printing Office, 1880–1901.

External links
Who Lived This History? Combahee Raid, Lowcountry Africana

Battles of the Lower Seaboard Theater and Gulf Approach of the American Civil War
Union victories of the American Civil War
Raids of the American Civil War
Slavery in the United States
Beaufort County, South Carolina
Colleton County, South Carolina
Military history of African Americans in the American Civil War
1863 in South Carolina
Military operations of the American Civil War in South Carolina
June 1863 events